ABRS may mean:

ABRS Management & Technology Institute a Hong Kong-based education institute
ABS (TV station) aka ABRS, the Australian Broadcasting Corporation's TV station in Loxton, South Australia
Acute bacterial rhinosinusitis
Australian Biological Resources Study